The 1959 VFL Grand Final was an Australian rules football game contested between the Melbourne Football Club and Essendon Football Club, held at the Melbourne Cricket Ground on 20 September 1959. It was the 62nd annual Grand Final of the Victorian Football League, staged to determine the premiers for the 1959 VFL season. The match, attended by	103,506 spectators, was won by Melbourne by 37 points, marking that club's tenth premiership victory.

This was Melbourne's sixth successive Grand Final appearance. It was the second time in three years in which the two teams met in a Grand Final, with Melbourne also having won the 1957 VFL Grand Final.

Teams

{|
|valign="top"|

Umpire: Bill Barbour

Statistics

Goalkickers

References
AFL Tables: 1959 Grand Final
 The Official statistical history of the AFL 2004 
 Ross, J. (ed), 100 Years of Australian Football 1897-1996: The Complete Story of the AFL, All the Big Stories, All the Great Pictures, All the Champions, Every AFL Season Reported, Viking, (Ringwood), 1996.

See also
 1959 VFL season

VFL/AFL Grand Finals
Vfl Grand Final, 1959
Melbourne Football Club
Essendon Football Club